Joshua Eagle and David Rikl were the defending champions but did not compete that year.

Tomáš Cibulec and Pavel Vízner won in the final 3–6, 6–3, 6–4 against Yevgeny Kafelnikov and Kevin Ullyett.

Seeds
Champion seeds are indicated in bold text while text in italics indicates the round in which those seeds were eliminated.

 Max Mirnyi /  Jared Palmer (semifinals)
 Martin Damm /  Cyril Suk (semifinals)
 Yevgeny Kafelnikov /  Kevin Ullyett (final)
 Gastón Etlis /  Martín Rodríguez (first round)

Draw

External links
 2003 Mercedes Cup Doubles draw

Doubles 2003
Stuttgart Open Doubles